Henri Pavin de Lafarge (17 October 1889 – 30 June 1965) was a French businessman and politician. He served as a member of the French Senate from 1930 to 1945, where he represented Ardèche.

References

1889 births
1965 deaths
People from Ardèche
École Centrale Paris alumni
20th-century French businesspeople
French Senators of the Third Republic
Senators of Ardèche